S. S. Khan is an Indian bureaucrat and former member of Central Board of Direct Taxes (CBDT). He is also member of the governments technology advisory group, TAGUP.

Career
He is an officer of the 1972 batch of the Indian Revenue Service.

He served as Director General of Income Tax (Investigation) and Director of Income Tax (Systems) among others in the Income Tax department.

References

Living people
Indian Revenue Service officers
Year of birth missing (living people)